Northcott was an electoral district of the Legislative Assembly in the Australian state of New South Wales between 1968 and 1999.

History
It was named after Sir John Northcott who served as Governor of New South Wales from 1 August 1946 to 1 August 1957. Northcott was the first Australian appointed to a State vice-regal position.

It was represented by Jim Cameron, Bruce Baird, and Barry O'Farrell, all of whom served as Deputy Leaders of their party, although in O'Farrell's case he became Deputy Liberal leader after moving to Ku-ring-gai following Northcott's abolition.

O'Farrell succeeded Baird in Northcott in 1995. When O'Farrell resigned as NSW Premier in 2014 he was succeeded by Baird's son Mike. Bruce Baird himself had failed to become Premier to succeed Nick Greiner in 1992 which eventually led to Baird's retirement from Northcott in 1995 and then enabled O'Farrell to succeed him in the seat. Northcott marked the beginning of O'Farrell's tenure in the New South Wales Parliament and his eventual path in becoming Premier, a premiership that ended when O'Farrell was succeeded by Mike Baird, the son of O'Farrell's Northcott predecessor.

Members for Northcott

Election results

References

Former electoral districts of New South Wales
1968 establishments in Australia
Constituencies established in 1968
1999 disestablishments in Australia
Constituencies disestablished in 1999